The Chuck Woolery Show was an American talk show featuring television personality Chuck Woolery conducting interviews with various celebrities. Randy West served as the show’s announcer; this was among his first handful of national series, his second announcing assignment for a Group W syndicated show, following Hour Magazine.

The Chuck Woolery Show premiered in daytime syndication on September 16, 1991 and was a joint production of Eric Lieber Productions and Charwool Productions, Inc. (the latter a joint venture between Woolery and Charles Colarusso, who served as one of the show’s producers). The program was distributed by Westinghouse Broadcasting through its Group W Productions subsidiary and was based at Hollywood Center Studios in California.

Personnel
In addition to his duties as host, Woolery served as a co-executive producer with Eric Lieber, who was also producing Love Connection in syndication with Woolery hosting. Charles Colarusso, a veteran television producer, was one of the show’s producers with former Goodson-Todman Productions producer Jake Tauber and former Divorce Court and Tomorrow producer Bruce McKay joining him and Lieber.

Opening

Each episode of The Chuck Woolery Show opened with a skateboard positioned somewhere on the Hollywood Walk of Fame. A person wearing blue Chuck Taylor All-Stars would run up to it and jump on it, with the camera panning up to reveal Woolery riding the skateboard.

As the show’s theme song played, Woolery (or, to be precise, a stunt double) rode the skateboard along the sidewalk, doing tricks and dodging pedestrians on his way into the studio, making it inside just before the door to the stage closed behind him.

Format
The Chuck Woolery Show, like some other shows of the day, was a celebrity-driven show. Each episode featured four celebrities, and Woolery would spend several minutes talking with each one individually. The interview area was set up much like the way the stage was set up on The Arsenio Hall Show, with a lounge chair for Woolery to sit in and a couch for the guests as opposed to the usual desk and chair setup so many other celebrity talk shows have used.

Also, like many talk shows of its ilk, The Chuck Woolery Show employed a live band to play in the studio. The ensemble was led by the show’s music director Dana Robbins, who at the time was a widely regarded session player whose specialty is the saxophone and who currently is the lead saxophone player in Delbert McClinton’s backing band.

The show would sometimes feature a studio audience member ask questions to each of the four guests for a particular day.

Further information
The Chuck Woolery Show was sold in 70% of the United States by the time the 1991 NATPE convention, during which many syndicated programs are pitched and sold to stations, was held. Orion Television was set to distribute the series with Group W handling advertising sales. As such, every station that Westinghouse Broadcasting owned (with the exception of KDKA-TV in Pittsburgh) cleared the show as did KCAL in Los Angeles, which the company had been trying to purchase (ultimately failing). Many NBC affiliates, where audiences had familiarity with Woolery due to his years hosting the game shows Wheel of Fortune and Scrabble on the network, also signed on, including Chicago’s WMAQ-TV, which the network owned. In the largest market in the nation, the New York City media market, NBC’s competitor CBS bought Woolery’s show for its flagship station WCBS-TV.

Despite the clearances, trouble plagued the production from the start. First, the show lost its distributor shortly after NATPE’s convention. Orion Pictures, the parent company of Orion Television, had been in significant financial trouble for much of the previous year and suspended all of its operations in early 1991. Group W was forced to step in and assume distributorship, but some prospective affiliates decided to drop the program. Some markets did not pick up the show at all.

Although many of the stations that picked up The Chuck Woolery Show aired it in normally solid time slots for daytime programming, the ratings never took off. Four additional talk shows premiered for the 1991-92 season and each one performed better in the ratings than Woolery’s show did, and executive producer Eric Lieber was said to be a rather significant problem for station managers airing the show.

Randy West, the show’s announcer, has said that Lieber’s conduct eventually led to the show’s demise following its initial thirteen week run. Several weeks into the run, Lieber and the program director at WCBS were speaking over the telephone. The station gave Woolery the 9:00 AM Eastern time slot, which was its lead out program for CBS This Morning. The show was already facing a potential rating competition from Live with Regis and Kathie Lee on WABC, which had the benefit of airing live in many markets and was a significant success in syndication; while the show did not make enough of a dent in the ratings, WCBS was at least willing to keep it there in the short term.

However, during the course of the phone call, Lieber proved to be unwilling to listen to anything the WCBS program director said to him. In fact, after the conversation between the two men ended, Lieber had so offended the program director that The Chuck Woolery Show was almost immediately removed from the station’s daytime schedule and relocated to a lower-rated 2:00 AM time slot. Shortly thereafter, many of the show’s other affiliate stations began following WCBS’ lead; the ensuing drop in what was already a low ratings figure resulted in Group W deciding to cease production on The Chuck Woolery Show after sixty-five episodes were produced.

Woolery continued hosting Love Connection while his talk show was in production; once it was cancelled he was able to focus primarily on his position there and would remain as host of the show until it was cancelled in 1994.

References

1991 American television series debuts
1991 American television series endings
Television series by CBS Studios
1990s American television talk shows